Algenol, founded in 2009, headquartered in Fort Myers, Florida, Algenol is an industrial biotechnology company that is commercializing patented algae technology for production of ethanol and other fuels. The technology enables the production of the four most important fuels (ethanol, gasoline, jet, and diesel fuel) using a proprietary process involving algae, sunlight, carbon dioxide and salt water.

History

In 2008 the company announced it would begin commercial production of Ethanol by 2009 in the Sonoran Desert in northwest Mexico. This seems not to have happened though and as of 2015 they are still not in commercial production. In October 2015 Paul Woods, the founder, resigned and the company announced they were laying off 25% of the staff and changing to a  “water treatment and carbon capture now, and maybe fuels later” focus. In 2016, Algenol celebrated its 10th Anniversary and added algae-based sustainable products to its portfolio.  Their name changed to Algenol Biotech LLC, and they are focusing on algae-based product development and manufacturing.

Research
Algenol’s biofuel technology potentially allows production of the four most important fuels (ethanol, gasoline, jet, and diesel fuel) for around $1.27 per  gallon each at production levels of 8,000 total gallons of liquid fuel per acre per year, but to date has not been successfully implemented in commercial production. Potentially the fuel would be produced with a 60% reduction in carbon footprint and could offer customers savings of 75 cents a gallon. The technology could produce high yields and relies on patented photobioreactors and proprietary downstream techniques for low-cost fuel production. These low-cost techniques consume carbon dioxide from industrial sources,  do not use farmland or food crops, and provide fresh water. 

Their biofuel technology uses sunlight, algae, non-arable land and carbon dioxide to produce ethanol and the leftover spent algae that can be converted into other biofuels. The technology uses blue-green algae (or cyanobacteria) to change  and seawater into sugars and then into ethanol and biomass. 
Algenol’s algae are non-invasive in natural habitats and the company has tested the algae repeatedly to ensure it is non-toxic, non-invasive, and are not plant pests

Locations
Algenol's newest facility is located in Southwest Florida, just north of Florida Gulf Coast University in Fort Myers, and opened in October 2010.  The new commercial development facility is working to create a commercially viable fuel from algae.  The site features research labs including engineering facilities, advanced molecular biology,  management, separations, and  green chemistry advanced labs and an outdoor process development production unit on 40 acres. It is to cover 43,000sqft and to include  of photobioreactors
In October 2011, Algenol began construction on a pilot-scale Integrated Biorefinery, allowing the company to work with algae from a single strain in the lab all the way to commercial-scale production. The Integrated Biorefinery, completed in 2012, demonstrates the commercial viability of the technology.

Algenol also has subsidiaries located in Berlin, Germany and Zug, Switzerland.

Projects
Algenol licenses the DIRECT TO ETHANOL® technology. One of these licenses is with BioFields S.A.P.I. de C.V. in Mexico. BioFields has access to over 42,000 acres of non-arable land in the Sonoran desert in Mexico. The area is close to waters for transportation and growing ethanol markets in South America. Another large partner of  Algenol's is Reliance Industries Ltd. based in Mumbai India.  Finally, Algenol has stated that they are discussing commercial "Direct to Ethanol" projects with several partners in the United States, South America, Israel, and Africa.

Partnerships
Algenol has a number of partners. Partners include the National Renewable Energy Laboratory, BioFields, Membrane Technology and Research, and Reliance Holdings USA, Inc. Algenol also is partnered with Lee County, Florida and the U.S. Department of Energy  along with Universities including Florida Gulf Coast University, Georgia Tech, and Humboldt University of Berlin.

Grants awarded
In December 2009, Algenol received a $25 million United States Department of Energy grant to help build the Integrated Biorefinery Direct to Ethanol project in Lee County, Florida. Algenol also received a $10M grant from Lee County to employ people in Lee County and also build the  Integrated Biorefinery Direct to Ethanol project.

References

External links
 Algenol company website
 Algenol company website (archived version)
 Marketwatch article with video of the Algenol process from March 2010

Algal fuel producers
Alcohol fuel producers
Algae biomass producers